A nutrient enema, also known as feeding per rectum, rectal alimentation, or rectal feeding, is an enema administered with the intent of providing nutrition when normal eating is not possible. This treatment is ancient, dating back at least to the second century AD when documented by Galen, and commonly used in the Middle Ages, remaining a common technique in 19th century, and as recently as 1941 the U.S.' military manual for hospital diets prescribed their use. Nutrient enemas have been superseded in modern medical care by tube feeding and intravenous feeding.

A variety of different mixes have been used for nutrient enemas throughout history. A paper published in Nature in 1926 stated that because the rectum and lower digestive tract lack digestive enzymes, it is likely that only the end-products of normal digestion such as sugars, amino acids, salt and alcohol, will be absorbed.

This treatment was given to U.S. President James A. Garfield after his shooting in 1881.

When the United States Senate Intelligence Committee published an unclassified summary of its 6,000 page classified report on the CIA's use of torture, its previously unknown practices of brutally forced nutrient enemas on detainees who attempted hunger strikes and of "rectal rehydration" for punishment and torture became apparent.

See also 
 Murphy drip

References 

Nutrition
Intensive care medicine
Enteral feeding
Rectum
Torture in the United States